Cytochrome P450 2S1 is a protein that in humans is encoded by the CYP2S1 gene.  The gene is located in chromosome 19q13.2 within a cluster including other CYP2 family members such as CYP2A6, CYP2A13, CYP2B6, and CYP2F1.

Expression
CYP2S1 is highly expressed in epithelial tissues of the respiratory, gastrointestinal, urinary tracts, and skin and in leukocytes of the monocyte/macrophage and lymphocyte series; it is also expressed throughout Embryogenesis and, as discussed below, certain types of cancers.

Function 
This gene encodes a member of the cytochrome P450 superfamily of enzymes. The cytochrome P450 proteins are monooxygenases which catalyze many reactions involved in drug metabolism and synthesis of cholesterol, steroids and other lipids. This protein localizes to the endoplasmic reticulum. In rodents, the homologous protein has been shown to metabolize certain carcinogens although its specific function(s) in humans has not been clearly determined.  In in vitro studies, the human enzyme has been found to metabolize all-trans-retinoic acid to 4-hydroxy-retinoic acid and 5, 6-epoxy-retinoic acid and therefore may play a role in processing retinoic acid in tissues where it is highly expressed such as the skin. CYP2S1 is significantly overexpressed and, perhaps directly related to this, its gene is significantly hypomethylated (see gene methylation in the skin of Han Chinese patients with psoriasis suggesting that it plays a role in the development of this disease.

CYP2S1 has been suggested to be involved in the growth and/or spread of certain tumors of epithelial cell origin: its higher expression in breast or colorectal cancer tissues appears associated  respectively with shorter survival times or poor prognoses, and it is more highly expressed in metastasis compared to primary tumor tissues of ovarian cancer.

CYP2S1 has recently been assigned epoxygenase activity. It  metabolizes 1) arachidonic acid to its various epoxides, i.e., the epoxyeicosatrienoic acids (also termed EETs); 2) docosahexaenoic acid to its various epoxides, i.e. the epoxydocosapentaenoic acids (also termed EDPs); and 3) linoleic acid to its various epoxides, i.e. vernolic acid (also termed leukotoxin) and coronaric acid (also termed isoleukotoxin).  It seems likely, although not yet tested, that CYP231 will also prove able to metabolize other polyunsaturated fatty acids to their epoxides; for example, the enzyme may metabolize eicosapentaenoic acid to epoxyeicosatetraenoic acids (also termed EEQs). Animal model studies implicate the EET, EDP, and EEQ epoxides in regulating blood pressure, tissue blood flow, new blood vessel formation (i.e. angiogenesis, pain perception, and the growth of various cancers; limited studies suggest but have not proven that these epoxides may function similarly in humans (see epoxyeicosatrienoic acid, epoxydocosapentaenoic acid, eicosatetraenoic acid, and epoxygenase pages). The CYP2S1-dependent production of EETs, which stimulate the growth of various types of cancer cells, including those of the colon (see epoxyeicosatrienoic acid#cancer), could contribute to the unfavorable effects of this CYP in the sited cancers.

Vernolic and coronaric acids are potentially toxic, causing multiple organ failure and acute respiratory distress when injected into animals and suggested to be involved in causing these syndromes in humans.

CYP2S1 has also been found to metabolize Prostaglandin G2 and Prostaglandin H2 to the biologically active product, 12-Hydroxyheptadecatrienoic acid (i.e. 12(S)-hydroxyheptadeca-5Z,8E,10E-trienoic acid, also termed 12-HHT).

References

External links

Further reading